David E. Marchant (born 1965) is a British-born US-based journalist. He is the editor and owner of OffshoreAlert, a news service and conference organizer that specializes in exposing financial crimes before they occur.

Early life and career
Marchant was born in 1965. His first journalistic job was as a news reporter for The Gwent Gazette (1985–1987) in Ebbw Vale, Wales. He then worked as a reporter for the Bournemouth Evening Echo (1987–1989) and the Western Daily Press (1989–1990). From 1990 to 1993, he was a business reporter for The Royal Gazette in Bermuda. From 1994 to 1996, he was business editor at the Bermuda Sun.

OffshoreAlert
In 1997, Marchant founded OffshoreAlert. Since then, he has been sued in the United States, the Cayman Islands, Canada, and Panama. He was also sued in Grenada by former Prime Minister Keith Mitchell. Marchant claims to have all his stories approved by a lawyer before publishing. 

Marchant's stories have covered a Ponzi scheme at First International Bank of Grenada, a fraud case at the Cayman Islands-based Axiom Legal Financing Fund, and alleged irregularities at Belvedere Management group and a Spain-based investment group operating as Privilege Wealth. 

In 2009, The Wall Street Journal reported that 11 people had been charged with crimes as a result of his work, of whom five had been jailed. The first person to sue Marchant was Marc Harris, who was subsequently sentenced to 17 years in jail for money laundering and tax evasion.

According to Marchant, he has received more than one death threat, and the subject of one of his investigations had a T-shirt that read: "David Marchant is only alive because killing him would be a crime."

References

External links
 

Living people
British male journalists
British investigative journalists
1960s births
Year of birth uncertain
Money laundering